Man of the World 2023 will be the 5th edition of the Man of the World pageant. It will be held in the Philippines on June 16. Aditya Khurana of India will crown his successor at the end of the event.

Contestants

Notes

Crossover 
 Minor competitions
 Mister Glam International
 2021:  - Bruce Matheka
 Mister Africa International
 2021:  - Elvis Duarte

References

2023 in the Philippines
Man of the World (pageant)